Cross-country skiing at the 2013 European Youth Olympic Winter Festival is held at the Valea Râşnoavei Sport Center in Predeal, Romania  from 18 to 22 February 2013.

Results

Medal table

Men's events

Ladies events

Mixed events

References

External links
Results
The Venue at EYOWF 2013 | Photo Gallery
EYOWF 2013 - Presentation Video at YouTube
EYOWF 2013 - Facilities Presentation at YouTube

2013 in cross-country skiing
2013 European Youth Olympic Winter Festival events
2013